Nikolay Sergeyevich Enikolopov (Enikolopyan) (March 13, 1924, Stepanakert – January 22, 1993, Berlin) was an Armenian-Russian scientist, Doctor of Chemistry, professor, academic of Russian Academy of Sciences, director of the Institute of Synthetic polymers (Currently Nikolay Enikolopov Institute of Synthetic Polymers) of the Russian Academy of Sciences. In 1980 he was awarded by the Lenin Prize.

In 1945 Enikolopov graduated from the Yerevan Polytechnic Institute. Since 1946 he worked at the Moscow Institute of Chemical Physics of the Russian Academy of Sciences, headed the laboratory of polymers. In 1982-1993 he headed also a department at the Moscow Institute of Physics and Technology.

References

1924 births
1993 deaths
Soviet Armenians
Russian chemists
Soviet chemists
20th-century chemists
People from Stepanakert
Polymer scientists and engineers
National Polytechnic University of Armenia alumni
Academic staff of the Moscow Institute of Physics and Technology
Full Members of the USSR Academy of Sciences
Full Members of the Russian Academy of Sciences
Lenin Prize winners
Recipients of the Order of Lenin
Recipients of the Order of Friendship of Peoples